Hank the Cowdog is a scripted podcast written and directed by Jeff Nichols and produced by QCode. The five episode series stars Matthew McConaughey. The show is an adaptation of the Hank the Cowdog story called "Lost in the Dark Unchanted Forest".

Background 
The podcast was written and directed by Jeff Nichols. The podcast was produced by QCode and stars Matthew McConaughey. The podcast debuted on September 14, 2020 and released a new episode every Monday until October 12, 2020. The podcast was nominated for an iHeartRadio Podcast Award in 2021 and was also nominated for an Ambies Award in 2021.

Cast and characters 

 Matthew McConaughey as Hank
 Jesse Plemons as Drover
 Kirsten Dunst as Sally May
 John R. Erickson as Wallace the buzzard
 Scoot McNairy as Junior
 Michael Shannon as Sinister the Bobcat
 Joel Edgerton as Rip and Snort
 Leslie Jordan as Pete the Barn Cat
 Cynthia Erivo as Madame Moonshine

References 

Audio podcasts
2020 podcast debuts
2020 podcast endings
Scripted podcasts